Ploské may refer to several places in Slovakia:

Ploské, village and municipality in Košice-okolie District
Ploské, village and municipality in Revúca District